A hexagonal window (also Melnikov's or honeycomb window) is a hexagon-shaped window, resembling a bee cell or crystal lattice of graphite. The window can be vertically or horizontally oriented, openable or fixed. It can also be regular or elongately-shaped and can have a separator (mullion). Typically, the cellular window is used for an attic or as a decorative feature, but it can also be a major architectural element to provide the natural lighting inside buildings. The hexagonal window is relatively rare and associated with such architectural styles as constructivism, functionalism and, occasionally, cubism.

History
Attic hexagonal windows were occasionally used in the Northern European manor architecture of the 19th century. The concept became popular thanks to the Russian constructivist architect Konstantin Melnikov, whose own famous house had 124 hexagonal windows, which were the main source of light as ceiling lights were not provided in many rooms. Cellular windows are also a feature of the Scandinavian functionalism architecture of the 1940s–1960s and are a kind of synthesis of tradition and modernism in the architecture. Today, hexagonal windows may be associated with honeycomb houses, a concept proposed by architect Frank Lloyd Wright and explore an idea of organic architecture, which considers the nature as a main source of architectural imagination.

Gallery

References

Windows
Architectural elements